Alejandra Purisina Ramos Sánchez (born December 8, 1958) is a retired middle-distance runner from Chile.

She competed for her native South American country at the 1984 Summer Olympics in Los Angeles, California. Ramos obtained a personal best time of 4:13.07 in the 1,500 metres event in 1990.

International competitions

References

 
 

1958 births
Living people
Chilean female middle-distance runners
Olympic athletes of Chile
Athletes (track and field) at the 1984 Summer Olympics
Pan American Games medalists in athletics (track and field)
Athletes (track and field) at the 1975 Pan American Games
Athletes (track and field) at the 1983 Pan American Games
Pan American Games bronze medalists for Chile
South American Games gold medalists for Chile
South American Games medalists in athletics
Competitors at the 1978 Southern Cross Games
Medalists at the 1983 Pan American Games
20th-century Chilean women